Clément Otazo (born 3 May 1992) is a French professional rugby union player. He plays at fly-half for Saint-Jean-de-Luz Olympique rugby in the Fédérale 1 .

References

External links
Ligue Nationale De Rugby Profile
European Professional Club Rugby Stats
Bayonne Profile

Living people
1992 births
French rugby union players
Rugby union fly-halves